"The Best Things in Life Are Free" is a duet between American singers Luther Vandross and Janet Jackson, recorded for the Jimmy Jam and Terry Lewis produced soundtrack to the 1992 American film Mo' Money, starring Damon Wayans. The song was composed by Jam, Lewis, Michael Bivins, Ronnie DeVoe, Harry Wayne Casey and Richard Finch. The song was released as the soundtrack's lead single on May 12, 1992, by Perspective Records and A&M Records. Additionally, the song was remixed by David Morales, Frankie Knuckles, and CJ Mackintosh. The duet became a major hit in several countries, peaking at number two in Australia and the United Kingdom, number six in Ireland and New Zealand, number eight in Canada and Germany, and number 10 in the United States. The song was nominated for the Grammy Award for Best R&B Performance by a Duo or Group with Vocals.

The song was later included on Vandross' compilations One Night with You: The Best of Love, Volume 2 and Lovesongs, as well as Jackson's own compilations Design of a Decade: 1986–1996 and Number Ones respectively.  In 1995, the song was re-released as the second single from Jackson's aforementioned Design of a Decade 1986–1996 compilation album, included new remixes by Roger Sanchez, K-Klass and MK, exclusively in European countries. A further re-release followed as a limited-edition single in 1996. Jackson included the song on her 2011 tour, Number Ones, Up Close and Personal, and her 2015–2016 Unbreakable World Tour. It is also included in her 2019 Las Vegas Residency Janet Jackson: Metamorphosis.

Background and composition
In March 1991, Jackson signed  an unprecedented $32 million contract with Virgin Records, the largest record deal at the time, although it was quickly exceeded by her brother Michael and his label, Epic Records. Prior to her first release with Virgin, Jackson was asked by Jam and Lewis to record a song for the soundtrack to the feature film Mo' Money, released in 1992 by their label Perspective Records. Jon Bream of the Star Tribune reported: "For most movie soundtracks, producers negotiate with record companies, managers and lawyers for the services of big-name singers. Like the Hollywood outsiders that they are, Edina-based Jam and Lewis went directly to such stars as Janet Jackson, Luther Vandross, Bell Biv DeVoe, Color Me Badd and Johnny Gill." It was the first all-new song Jackson recorded at the new location of Flyte Tyme Studios in Edina, Minnesota, which was completed 2 months after wrapping up recording on her fourth studio album Rhythm Nation 1814 in May 1989 at the original Minneapolis studio. She had done re-recordings and remixes there from 1989 to 1991.

"The Best Things in Life Are Free" is an R&B, dance-pop and house song with a "steady beat". It is written in the key of Fm and their vocal ranges span from the low-note of F3 to C6. The song is set in the signature of common time and has a moderate tempo of 120 pulsations per minute. It follows the basic chord progression of B7m—C7m—F7.

Critical reception
Larry Flick from Billboard wrote, "First peek into the hotly anticipated soundtrack to the film "Mo' Money" is a glittery, star-studded pop/jack affair. Vandross and Jackson vocally swerve and weave around each other like they've been singing together for years. Added flavor comes from guest raps by Bell Biv DeVoe and Tresvant. The true kudos, however, go to the masterful Jimmy Jam and Terry Lewis, who have crafted a slammin' track that would work no matter what." Amy Linden from Entertainment Weekly commented, "While the combo of Janet Jackson and Luther Vandross may be a marketing dream, artistically it blows. The trademark busy groove that defines Janet buries Luther, who doesn’t need a crutch and who, when free of misguided arrangements, eats singers like Janet for lunch." John Martinucci from the Gavin Report said the duo "sound great together working over this high energy song". Also Alan Jones from Music Week agreed that "it's appeal is in the super-smooth vocal combination of Janet and Luther." Another editor, Andy Beevers stated that the track is "very catchy and funky". Tom Doyle from Smash Hits described it as "a smooth club number with a dreamy soul feel and a rap from the "special guests" in the middle."

Chart performance
In the United States, "The Best Things in Life Are Free" debuted at number 24 on the U.S. Billboard Hot 100 the week of May 30, 1992. Three weeks later, the song peaked at number 10 for three consecutive weeks and ended at number 41 on the year-end chart. The song also peaked at number one on the Hot R&B/Hip-Hop Songs.

In the United Kingdom the song was released in August 1992 and peaked at number two on the UK Singles Chart, spending 13 weeks in the chart. It became Jackson's first top-ten hit in the UK since "Let's Wait Awhile" reached number three in 1987. The song was remixed in 1995 and re-released, reaching number seven. It was the remixed version that was included on international releases of Janet's compilation album Design of a Decade: 1986–1996. In Australia the single spent five consecutive weeks at number two on the ARIA Singles Chart, spending 18 weeks on the chart, and was ranked at number six on the year-end chart.

Music video
A music video was made for the song, although neither Vandross nor Jackson  appear in it. Instead, the video features Mo' Moneys stars Damon Wayans and Stacey Dash, at a carnival, lip-synching to the song; Damon's brother Marlon Wayans, who also appears in Mo' Money, has a cameo appearance in the video.

Also included on the track is Michael Bivins and Ronnie DeVoe of Bell Biv DeVoe.  Ralph Tresvant also has a very brief spoken line.  He appears solo on the song "Money Can't Buy You Love" from the soundtrack.

Track listings
Original version
"A Little Bit of Mo' Money The Original Motion Picture Soundtrack" consists of three snippets: "Money Can't Buy You Love" by Ralph Tresvant, "Let's Just Run Away" by Johnny Gill, and "Let's Get Together (So Groovy Now)" by Krush.US and Japanese CD single "The Best Things in Life Are Free" (classic 12-inch mix) – 5:53
 "The Best Things in Life Are Free" (CJ's U.K. 12-inch mix) – 9:58
 "The Best Things in Life Are Free" (Def version) – 8:41
 "The Best Things in Life Are Free" (CJ's FXTC dub) – 6:51
 "The Best Things in Life Are Free" (CJ's Vinyl Zone dub) – 6:49
 "The Best Things in Life Are Free" (album version) – 4:36US 12-inch singleA1. "The Best Things in Life Are Free" (classic 12-inch mix) – 5:54
A2. "The Best Things in Life Are Free" (Def version) – 8:41
A3. "The Best Things in Life Are Free" (album version) – 4:36
B1. "The Best Things in Life Are Free" (CJ's U.K. 12-inch mix) – 10:01
B2. "The Best Things in Life Are Free" (CJ's FXTC dub) – 6:51
B3. "The Best Things in Life Are Free" (CJ's Vinyl Zone dub) – 6:49US 7-inch singleA. "The Best Things in Life Are Free" – 4:37
B. "The Best Things in Life Are Free" (no rap) – 4:27US cassette single "The Best Things in Life Are Free" – 4:36
 "A Little Bit of Mo' Money The Original Motion Picture Soundtrack"UK CD single "The Best Things in Life Are Free" (CJ's UK 7-inch with rap)
 "The Best Things in Life Are Free" (CJ's UK 12-inch with rap)
 "The Best Things in Life Are Free" (classic 7-inch with rap)
 "The Best Things in Life Are Free" (classic 12-inch with rap)
 "The Best Things in Life Are Free" (Def version)
 "The Best Things in Life Are Free" (CJ's UK dub 1)UK 12-inch singleA1. "The Best Things in Life Are Free" (LP version)
A2. "The Best Things in Life Are Free" (CJ's UK 12-inch with rap)
A3. "The Best Things in Life Are Free" (CJ's Mackapella)
B1. "The Best Things in Life Are Free" (CJ's UK 12-inch with rap)
B2. "The Best Things in Life Are Free" (Def version)
B3. "The Best Things in Life Are Free" (CJ's UK dub 1)UK 7-inch and cassette singleA. "The Best Things in Life Are Free" (CJ's UK 7-inch with rap)
B. "The Best Things in Life Are Free" (classic 7-inch with rap)Australian CD and cassette single "The Best Things in Life Are Free" (classic 7-inch with rap)
 "The Best Things in Life Are Free" (classic 7-inch without rap)
 "A Little Bit of Mo' Money The Original Motion Picture Soundtrack"

1995 remixes
"Megamix" consists of seven songs by Janet Jackson: "What Have You Done for Me Lately", "When I Think of You", "Escapade", "Miss You Much", "Alright", "The Pleasure Principle", and "Runaway".UK CD1 and cassette single "The Best Things in Life Are Free" (K-Klass 7-inch)
 "Runaway" (G Man's hip hop mix featuring Coolio)
 "Megamix"UK CD2 "The Best Things in Life Are Free" (K-Klass 7-inch)
 "The Best Things in Life Are Free" (K-Klass 12-inch)
 "The Best Things in Life Are Free" (MK 12-inch)
 "The Best Things in Life Are Free" (S-Man Salsoul Vibe)
 "The Best Things in Life Are Free" (C.J. Mackintosh original remix)French CD single "The Best Things in Life Are Free" (K-Klass 7-inch)
 "Megamix"German CD single "The Best Things in Life Are Free" (K-Klass 7-inch) – 4:22
 "Runaway" (Kelly's Bump & Run mix) – 8:08European maxi-CD single'
 "The Best Things in Life Are Free" (K-Klass 7-inch edit) – 4:22
 "The Best Things in Life Are Free" (S-Man Salsoul Vibe) – 11:40
 "The Best Things in Life Are Free" (K-Klass 12-inch mix) – 8:54

Charts

Weekly charts

Year-end charts

Certifications

Release history

See also
 List of number-one R&B singles of 1992 (U.S.)

References

Bibliography

External links
 luthervandross.com

1992 singles
1992 songs
1995 singles
A&M Records singles
American house music songs
Janet Jackson songs
Luther Vandross songs
New jack swing songs
American dance-pop songs
Male–female vocal duets
Perspective Records singles
Songs written by Harry Wayne Casey
Songs written by Jimmy Jam and Terry Lewis
Songs written by Michael Bivins
Songs written by Richard Finch (musician)
Songs written by Ronnie DeVoe
Songs written for films